Unforgettable is a 1996 science fiction thriller film directed by John Dahl and starring Ray Liotta and Linda Fiorentino. The film is about a man named David Krane (Liotta), who is obsessed with finding out who murdered his wife.

John Dahl's follow up to his critically acclaimed 1994 film, The Last Seduction, Unforgettable was a critical and box office failure, only earning less than $3 million in the United States.

Plot 

Seattle Medical Examiner Dr. David Krane (Ray Liotta) arrives at a crime scene, an apparent drug store robbery. He finds a matchbook that reminds him of a similar matchbook found at the scene of his wife Mary's murder. Krane is convinced that the killer is the same man who killed his wife. He approaches Detective Don Bresler (Peter Coyote), insisting that, should he find a suspect, to interrogate them about his wife's murder.

Later, Krane goes to a dinner where Dr. Martha Briggs (Linda Fiorentino) gives a lecture on her experiment to transfer memories. She tells Krane that neuro-peptides are used in forming memories and can be retrieved from Cerebral Spinal Fluid (CSF). She has created a serum designed to facilitate the memory transfer process but an external stimulus similar to the memory must also be present for the memories to successfully imprint on the recipient. When Dr. Krane learns human trials are many years away, he says he would volunteer to try the serum, but Dr. Briggs refuses.

Later that evening Krane retrieves the sample of CSF from his wife's autopsy, and then breaks into Dr. Briggs' office. He then goes back to his house which is filled with crime scene photos. Krane injects himself with the serum, and has a memory flash of the night of his wife's murder, but is unable to see the killer's face. Krane then returns to the lab, retrieves the CSF from the female victim at the drug store. Krane drives to the drug store where he then injects himself, again, with the serum. Krane is finally able to see the killer's face. He then meets with a police sketch artist and tries to create a sketch of the killer. Krane and his friend and colleague, Curtis Avery (David Paymer), enter the sketch into a computer program that generates a searchable photo of the killer.

Dr. Briggs then confronts Krane about the break in and the theft of her serum. He explains that it works and that you experience the memory as if it were happening to you. Dr. Briggs is worried about side effects and gives Krane a physical, noting that there has been "significant" damage to Krane's heart. Curtis says they got a hit on the photo, identifying the suspect as Eddie Dutton.  Dutton has a long criminal history, including drugs and several murders for hire. Curtis gives Krane Eddie's last known address.

Krane and Dr. Briggs travel to the seedy motel where Eddie Dutton resides.  He soon sees Eddie in the elevator, and has an overreaction to seeing him. Krane runs down the stairs after Eddie. Dr. Briggs yells at Krane to stop as he is straining his heart. Krane pursues Eddie, who pulls out a gun and starts to fire at Krane. Eddie runs into an alley, where the two struggle and Krane ends up with Eddie's gun. Eddie runs into a Catholic church, and grabs a young boy, holding him hostage with a knife. Dr Krane tries to talk Eddie down when the police arrive. Eventually Det. Bresler fatally shoots Eddie, and Dr. Krane is upset because he did not get to question Eddie.

Dr. Krane is confronted about his erratic behavior by his supervisor who fires him. Krane and Dr. Briggs go to the Police station, where Krane sneaks into the autopsy room and steals a sample of Eddie's CSF.

Back at his house, Krane injects himself with the serum, using Eddie's CSF. Krane has a flash of what appears to be Eddie having rough sex with a woman, who may be Mary. In the midst of the memory flashback Krane inadvertently begins to choke Dr. Briggs. During the flashback Dr. Krane sees that Eddie notices Krane returning to the house and Eddie flees, apparently before Mary is actually dead. Dr. Briggs finds Krane at the bottom of the porch stairs and administers the nitroglycerin to him. He explains that Eddie did not kill his wife, and that he had come home drunk that night and passed out in the front yard while his wife was being murdered. Krane opens up about how he was a drunk and the marriage was on the rocks. He mentions that when his wife died she was 5 weeks pregnant.

The next morning Dr. Briggs goes to Curtis and asks him to get a DNA sample from Krane. As Dr. Briggs is running the DNA for a paternity test, Krane walks in and is angry that she would test the paternity without consulting him. The paternity test shows the baby was not Krane's child.

Krane rushes over and confronts Mary's sister Kelly (Kim Cattrall). They argue, and Kelly says that Mary was having an affair with a police detective. While talking to Det. Bresler about this new information, Krane begins to have flashbacks of an interrogation of Eddie. These flashbacks cause a heart attack and Krane is rushed to the hospital. Krane has flashbacks of the night and subsequent events of Mary's murder. While Krane and Dr. Briggs are at the hospital, an explosive device destroys Dr. Briggs office.

After Krane recovers, Detective Stewart Gleick (Christopher McDonald) the original detective on Mary's case, approaches Krane in the hospital saying that a detective named Joseph Bodner may be the man with whom Mary was involved, thus making him the likely father of her unborn child. Detective Bodner tried to commit suicide on the same day Mary was killed, but ended up in a coma instead. Krane and Dr. Briggs go to the hospice where Det. Bodner is, and take a sample of his CSF. Krane and Dr. Briggs argue about who should take the injection. Krane says he is not taking any chances and he tapes Dr. Briggs to the seat and injects himself. He confirms that his wife was in fact having an affair with Bodner. Mary met Detective Bodner who was a witness against Detective Bresler, who is revealed to have been quite corrupt.

As Krane is reliving these memories, Detective Bresler arrives at the house and begins to set the scene to kill Krane and Dr. Briggs by lighting a fire. Kelly arrives at the house with Krane's kids, just as Bresler is about to kill them. Krane fights Bresler, beating him unconscious. Krane then pulls Dr. Briggs out of the house, and then rushes in to save Bresler. He then goes back into the burning house to retrieve the microcassette recorder that recorded Bresler's confession.

The movie ends with Krane in a coma. He imagines he is with his wife. Dr. Briggs explains that his wounds should heal, but he is not responding mentally. Det. Gleick tells Krane that they got Bresler. Dr. Briggs says he could snap out of his coma at any time. The scene then shifts to Krane imagining playing with his kids, he looks back over his shoulder and his wife turns and fades away.

Cast 
 Ray Liotta as Dr. David Krane
 Linda Fiorentino as Dr. Martha Briggs
 Peter Coyote as Don Bresler
 Christopher McDonald as Stewart Gleick
 Kim Coates as Eddie Dutton
 David Paymer as Curtis Avery
 Kim Cattrall as Kelly
 William B. Davis as Dr. Smoot

Production

Filming 
Ray Liotta told an interviewer some anecdotes about filming in the morgue:

Reception

Box office 
The film had an estimated budget of $18 million and earned $2,821,671  in the United States.

Critical response 
The film received negative reviews from critics. It holds a 21% rating on Rotten Tomatoes, based on 28 reviews, with an average score of 4.4 out of 10. Audiences surveyed by CinemaScore gave the film a grade "C+" on scale of A to F.

Janet Maslin, writing in The New York Times, said, "Though it's well made, Unforgettable is also gimmicky, with too much of the plot revolving around voyeuristic tricks. Tapping into the same kind of virtual reality gambit seen in Strange Days, Unforgettable deals with one person's ability to borrow the experiences of others ... Insanely far-fetched as this is, it's hardly dull. Mr. Dahl's visual imagination is in fine form, even if his storytelling shows no great eagerness to escape from the B-movie sphere."

Roger Ebert gave the film one and a half stars, calling it "a mess". "In the annals of cinematic goofiness, Unforgettable deserves a place of honor. This is one of the most convoluted, preposterous movies I've seen—a thriller crossed with lots of Mad Scientist stuff, plus wild chases, a shoot-out in a church, a woman taped to a chair in a burning room, an exploding university building, adultery, a massacre in a drugstore, gruesome autopsy scenes and even a moment when a character's life flashes before her eyes, which was more or less what was happening to me by the end of the film. What went wrong? ... The actors play this material perfectly straight, as if they thought this was a serious movie, or even a good one. That makes it all the more agonizing. At least in the old horror films, the actors knew how marginal the material was, and worked a little irony into their performances. Here everybody acts as if they're in something deep, like a Bergman film, or Chicago Hope", wrote Ebert. Gene Siskel gave it a thumbs-up, remarking that it was a "preposterous thriller, but a lot of fun". He made it a point to really praise the "enthusiastic performance by Ray Liotta".

The Miami Herald granted the film two out of four stars: "But there's little joy in watching the puzzle come together, since the script, by newcomer Bill Geddie, cheats. It's impossible for the viewer to solve the case alongside Krane: The movie withholds crucial information until a revelation-packed denouement. On a purely visceral level, the movie works better. At its best, Unforgettable recalls prime Hitchcock in the way it unearths great suspense in familiar situations, such as a long footchase and a supermarket robbery. The performances are strong, too. Liotta is an ideal choice: Even at his most sympathetic, he seems capable of great evil—he has the eyes of a madman—but the movie settles the issue of his culpability too early ... Dahl has made his name making movies intelligent and cynical; this one is neither. It's a genre piece that buries a terrific premise under a pile of contrivances. It's also a first for Dahl: a movie that's more fun to look at than it is to think about."

Reviewer Bryant Frazer gave the film a C− and wrote, "Liotta and Fiorentino look kind of sleepy throughout the whole proceeding ... but still, it has its moments, including the very ending, that really work—as if somewhere, buried inside this mess, there's a good movie trying to get out."

Chris Kridler of The Baltimore Sun did like the film, calling it "a pretty twisted story, contrived but entertaining".

Mick LaSalle of the San Francisco Chronicle described director Dahl as "a master of inciting fear and dread" and the film as "a striking piece of filmmaking ... For a good 45 minutes of its two-hour running time, Unforgettable has the viewer in a state of oppressive tension. The rest of the time you're just nervous."

References

External links 
 
 

1996 films
1996 science fiction films
1990s mystery films
1990s psychological thriller films
American mystery films
American psychological thriller films
American science fiction films
Films about memory
Films directed by John Dahl
Films produced by Dino De Laurentiis
Films produced by Martha De Laurentiis
Films scored by Christopher Young
Films set in Seattle
Films shot in Vancouver
Metro-Goldwyn-Mayer films
Spelling Films films
1990s English-language films
1990s American films